The 1955 Michigan State Spartans football team was an American football team that represented Michigan State University in the 1955 Big Ten Conference football season. In their third season playing in Big Ten Conference and their second season under head coach Duffy Daugherty, the Spartans compiled a 9–1 record (5–1 against Big Ten opponents),and outscored opponents by a total of 253 to 83. The team's sole loss was on the road and early in the season against rival Michigan by a 14–7 score.

In the final AP and UPI coaches polls, both released on November 28, 1955, Michigan State was ranked No. 2 behind No. 1 Oklahoma. In the UPI poll, the Sooners edged the Spartans by a narrow margin of 325 points to 309 points with seven of the coaches ranking Michigan State as the No. 1 team. In the AP poll, the Sooners tallied 3,581 points to 3,204 points for Michigan State. After the polls were finalized, the Spartans defeated No. 4 UCLA in the 1956 Rose Bowl. Neither the AP nor UPI conducted post-bowl polls in these years. Although most later rankings and analyses continued to recognize Oklahoma as the 1955 national champion, the Boand System recognized Michigan State as national champion.

Two Michigan State players, quarterback Earl Morrall and tackle Norm Masters, were selected as consensus first-team players on the 1955 All-America college football team. Fullback Jerry Planutis was also selected as a first-teaam All-American by Jet magazine.

Eight Michigan State players were selected by the Associated Press (AP), United Press (UP), or International News Service (INS) on the 1955 All-Big Ten Conference football team: quarterback Morrall (AP-1, UP-1, INS-1); halfback Walt Kowalczyk (AP-2, UP-2); halfback Clarence Peaks (UP-3); fullback Planutis (AP-2, UP-1); end John Lewis (UP-3); tackle Masters (AP-1, UP-2, INS-1); guard Carl "Buck" Nystrom (AP-1, UP-2, INS-1); and center Joe Badaczewski (UP-3).

Schedule

References

Michigan State
Michigan State Spartans football seasons
Rose Bowl champion seasons
Michigan State Spartans football